Odenton is a passenger rail station on the MARC Penn Line. It is located along the Northeast Corridor; Amtrak trains operating along the corridor pass through but do not stop. Both platforms at the station are high-level and are among the longest in the MARC system.

History

The Odenton station was originally built in 1872 by the Baltimore and Potomac Railroad which was later merged into the Pennsylvania Railroad on November 1, 1902. The station survived the merger between the New York Central Railroad and the PRR that formed Penn Central.  When Amtrak was formed in 1971, it initially retained very limited intercity service to the station - eventually dwindling to 2 trains each way, each day, Monday - Friday. Although the station building closed to the public at that time, it continued to be used as a maintenance-of-way storage facility.

Commuter passenger service has operated continuously from this station since prior to 1900. Since around 1989, the station has been served by MARC, a division of the Maryland Transportation Administration (MTA) who continues to provide commuter service to the area. MARC service has expanded and, currently, sees over 50 trains stopping there each day, Monday through Friday and new but growing service on week-ends and some holidays.

Station layout
The station has two side platforms serving the outer tracks of the Northeast Corridor, with a tunnel connecting the two platforms.

Connecting services
The National Security Agency (NSA) maintains a shuttle service from Odenton station to its Visitor Control Center at its headquarters at Fort George G. Meade; it has done so since 2005. In 2009 the U.S. Army established a similar shuttle service from Odenton station to the Army section of Fort Meade; the NSA operates this service, allowing garrison employees, persons with Fort Meade visitor passes, and U.S. Department of Defense IDs to board.

References

External links

 Station from Google Maps Street View
Odenton station history

Stations on the Northeast Corridor
MARC Train stations
Penn Line
1872 establishments in Maryland
Railway stations in the United States opened in 1872
Railway stations closed in 1971
Railway stations in the United States opened in 1989
Former Pennsylvania Railroad stations
Odenton, Maryland
Former Amtrak stations in Maryland